Bataan's 3rd congressional district is one of the three congressional districts of the Philippines in the province of Bataan. It has been represented in the House of Representatives since 2022. The district consists of western Bataan municipalities of Bagac, Dinalupihan, Mariveles and Morong. It is currently represented in the 19th Congress by Ma. Angela Garcia of the NUP, who is the district's first representative since its creation.

Representation history

Election results

2022

See also
Legislative districts of Bataan

Congressional districts of the Philippines
Politics of Bataan
2021 establishments in the Philippines
Congressional districts of Central Luzon
Constituencies established in 2021

References